Deh Qaed (also Romanized as Deh Qā‘ed and Deh Qā’ed) is a village in Dalaki Rural District of the Central District of Dashtestan County, Bushehr province, Iran. At the 2006 census, its population was 6,271 in 1,374 households. The following census in 2011 counted 7,083 people in 1,854 households. The latest census in 2016 showed a population of 7,509 people in 2,081 households; it was the largest village in its rural district.

References 

Populated places in Dashtestan County